Monte Alegre do Sul is a municipality in the state of São Paulo in Brazil. The population is 7,736 (2015 est.) in an area of 110 km². The elevation is 748 m.

References

Municipalities in São Paulo (state)